Sir Herbert Edwin Blain  (14 May 1870 – 16 December 1942) was a British trade unionist and political activist.

Blain was educated at Liverpool Technical School, then began his career as a clerk working for Liverpool Corporation.  In 1896, he formed the Liverpool Municipal Officers' Guild, an association which opened its membership to all local government officers in the city, regardless of grade.  In order to cement its position, he appointed prominent local officials and politicians to honorary positions in the guild, and organising a wide range of social and sporting activities for members.  Over the next few years, he worked with staff at other authorities to form their own guilds.

The Municipal Officers' Association (MOA), a small national organisation which focus on legislative reform to bring in pensions for local government officers, was collapsing in 1903, and invited Blain's guild to join.  Blain took up a post managing the West Ham tramways so that he could work closely with the association and, in 1904, was elected as its chairman.  Blain organised a conference to bring together the MOA, the local guilds, and a few other small unions, and in 1905, this formed the National Association of Local Government Officers (NALGO).

Blain served on the executive of NALGO, though never as a paid official.  In 1908, East Ham Council, run by the Municipal Alliance, decided to dismiss many of its officers, and reduce the wages and conditions of employment of the remainder.  Blain organised NALGO's opposition, finding union members to act as election agents for opponents who would reinstate the officers.  This proved hugely successful; every councillor who had supported the cuts lost their seat, and a new Progressive Party council was elected, which reinstated the dismissed staff and their previous conditions.

In 1913, Blain left local government employment to work with the new group combining London Underground Railways and the London General Omnibus Company, becoming its Operating Manager in 1914.  He left NALGO that year, and thereafter spent his spare time focusing on health and safety, founding the London Safety First Council and the Royal Society for the Prevention of Accidents.  In 1921, he became the assistant managing director of the London transportation group, leaving in 1924 to become principal agent for the Conservative Party, a role for which he was knighted.

References

1870 births
1942 deaths
Conservative Party (UK) people
Trade unionists from Liverpool
Knights Bachelor
British trade union leaders
Commanders of the Order of the British Empire